This article lists the prime ministers of Myanmar (also known as Burma) since the Burmese Declaration of Independence in 1948.

Prime ministers of Burma / Myanmar (1948–present)

(Dates in italics indicate de facto continuation of office)

Timeline

See also
 Myanmar
 Politics of Myanmar
 List of colonial governors of Burma
 List of premiers of British Burma
 President of Myanmar
 List of presidents of Myanmar
 Vice-President of Myanmar
 Prime Minister of Myanmar
 Deputy Prime Minister of Myanmar
 State Counsellor of Myanmar
 Chairman of the State Administration Council
 Lists of office-holders

Notes

References

External links
 World Statesmen – Myanmar (Burma)

Myanmar
Prime Ministers